The Nikon Coolpix P7100 is a digital compact camera announced by Nikon on August 24, 2011, successor to the Nikon Coolpix P7000. It differs from the earlier model by an extra control dial, flip-out screen and improved responsiveness.

References

http://www.dpreview.com/products/nikon/compacts/nikon_cpp7100/specifications

P7100
Cameras introduced in 2011